T'uquyuq (Quechua t'uqu a niche, hole or gap in the wall, -yuq a suffix,  "the one with gaps in the wall", also spelled Tucuyoc) is a mountain in the Cordillera Negra in the Andes of Peru which reaches a height of approximately . It lies in the Ancash Region, Recuay Province, Tapacocha District, southwest of the lake and the mountain named Yanaqucha ("black lake").

References 

Mountains of Peru
Mountains of Ancash Region